(Los Angeles 1923-) was a nisei Japanese American served as the Deputy International Commissioner of the Scout Association of Japan, a member of the National Board of Trustees, and a member of the Asia-Pacific Scout Committee.

In 1998, Takemiya was awarded the 268th Bronze Wolf, the only distinction of the World Organization of the Scout Movement, awarded by the World Scout Committee for exceptional services to world Scouting.

References

External links

complete list
airnet.ne.jp
Triennial Report
Full list of Japanese Bronze Wolf recipients
scout-kanagawa.org
 

Recipients of the Bronze Wolf Award
1923 births
Year of death missing
Scouting in Japan